The Sealed Room is a 1926 Australian silent film directed by and starring Arthur Shirley. It is considered a lost film.

Synopsis
Paul Craig (Arthur Shirley) is an aviator-inventor who becomes blind due to overwork. He stumbles into a room as a person is being killed by foreign agents – who decide to let Craig live because he cannot identify them. The murder is part of a plot to overthrow the monarchy of fictional Ruvania. Paul regains his sight and marries Angela (Grace Glover), whose brother was killed by the gang, and who is the ward of Carlo Gelmini (George Bryant), head of the gang. Angela lost her memory with the shock of her brother's death but manages to recover it and help Paul save Ruvania.

Cast
Arthur Shirley as Paul Craig
Grace Glover as Angela Scardon
George Bryant as Carlo Gelmini
Nellie Ferguson as Della Giovanna
Cora Warner
Leslie Woods
Cecil Scott
Carlton Stuart
Eric Harrison
Muriel Veck
John Bruce
Harry Halley
Walter Bentley

Production
Filming began in May 1925 at Australasian Films' studio in Rushcutters Bay and on location in the Blue Mountains. One scene included a recreation of William Shakespeare's Julius Caesar.

Release
The film was poorly reviewed and not a success at the box office. Shirley was unable to make his planned version of J. H. M. Abbott's novel Castle Vane called 1840. He left Australia and went to England and Rhodesia to launch a new production company.

References

External links

Complete script at National Archives of Australia

1926 films
Australian drama films
Australian silent feature films
Australian black-and-white films
Lost Australian films
1926 drama films
1926 lost films
Lost drama films
Films directed by Arthur Shirley
Silent drama films
1920s English-language films